XHJTA-FM is a radio station on 94.3 FM in Irapuato, Guanajuato. XHJTA is owned by Grupo ACIR and carries its Amor romantic music format.

History
XHJTA received its concession on October 14, 1976. It was originally owned by Armando Cardoña Muñoz.

In 2015, operation passed from Radio Integral to Radio XHJTA when ACIR opted to create 34 new limited liability holding companies for most of its stations.

References

External links
Amor 94.3 Facebook

Radio stations in Guanajuato
Radio stations established in 1980
Grupo ACIR